Leo Donald Koopmans (born November 28, 1953) is a former Dutch international ice hockey forward. Koopmans played 15 seasons in the Eredivisie, becoming the league's top scorer for 1977-8. He was born in Barrie, Ontario and since his retirement has continued to reside in the Barrie area where he owns a successful swimming pool construction business.

A 196 cm, 97 kg forward, Koopmans first played in the Dutch top division with HYS Veronica 538 in 1972. The next season, he left The Hague to join the Heerenveen Flyers. In 1975 he played for Tigers Amsterdam and for 1976-7 Nijmegen Tigers. Koopmans rejoined Heerenveen for 1977-8 and won the league's scoring title with 39 goals and 40 assists in 30 games. He remained with the Flyers until 1984, when he joined GIJS Groningen. He retired from top-level play in 1987.

He played 20 times for the Netherlands at an international level, including at the 1980 Winter Olympics.
Koopmans went scoreless in all 5 of the Netherlands games in Lake Placid as the team finished 8th. He played in two world championships. In 1981, the only time the country has competed in the contest's top tier, Koopmans scored 4 goals and an assist in 8 games. In Pool B in 1987, he scored 5 goals and collected 5 assists in 7 games.

References

External links
 

1953 births
Living people
Amstel Tijgers players
Canadian ice hockey forwards
Canadian people of Dutch descent
Dutch ice hockey forwards
GIJS Groningen players
Heerenveen Flyers players
HYS The Hague players
Ice hockey players at the 1980 Winter Olympics
Nijmegen Tigers players
Olympic ice hockey players of the Netherlands
Ice hockey people from Simcoe County
Sportspeople from Barrie